North Killingsworth Street is a light rail station on the MAX Yellow Line in Portland, Oregon. It is the fifth stop northbound on the Interstate MAX extension.

The station is located in the median of Interstate Avenue near the intersection of N. Killingsworth Street. This station has staggered side platforms which sit on either side of the cross street, because the route runs around this station on Interstate Avenue in the median. Artistic elements at the station are inspired by African art.

Bus line connections
This station is served by the following bus line: 
72 - Killingsworth/82nd Ave

External links
Station information (with northbound ID number) from TriMet
Station information (with southbound ID number) from TriMet
MAX Light Rail Stations – more general TriMet page

MAX Light Rail stations
MAX Yellow Line
Railway stations in the United States opened in 2004
2004 establishments in Oregon
North Portland, Oregon
Overlook, Portland, Oregon
Railway stations in Portland, Oregon